9th Communication Battalion (9th Comm) is a communications battalion in the United States Marine Corps. It is part of the I Marine Expeditionary Force (I MEF) and is headquartered at Marine Corps Base Camp Pendleton, California.

Subordinate units
 Headquarters Company
 Service Company
 Alpha Company
 Bravo Company
 Charlie Company
 Defensive Cyber Operations Internal Defensive Measures Company

History

Early years
9th Communication Battalion was activated 1 June 1966 at the Marine Corps Air Ground Combat Center Twentynine Palms, California. They were assigned to Force Troops, Fleet Marine Force Pacific in July 1967. The unit was reduced to zero strength and deactivated 15 October 1974. The Communication Support Company was activated 16 October 1974 but was quickly deactivated on 30 November 1976. It was again activated on 1 December 1976 as Communication Support Company, (Reinforced), 9th Communication Battalion at 29 Palms and assigned to Force Troops, FMF, Pacific. On 15 February 1979, Force Troops was deactivated and the battalion was assigned to Marine Corps Air Ground Combat Center (MCAGCC), 29 Palms.

1980s & 1990s
1 December 1982: Communication Company (Reinforced), 9th Communication Battalion redesignated at Camp Pendleton, California, as the 9th Communication Battalion, Fleet Marine Force
January 1984: Reassigned to I Marine Amphibious Force 
5 February 1988: I Marine Amphibious Force redesignated as I Marine Expeditionary Force
July 1989: Reassigned to 1st Surveillance, Reconnaissance, and Intelligence Group, I Marine Expeditionary Force 
August 1990-March 1991: Operation Desert Shield and Desert Storm, Southwest Asia 
December 1992-April 1993: Operation Restore Hope, Somalia 
Reassigned during June 1998 to I Marine Expeditionary Force Headquarters Group

Global War on Terror
9th Comm has made four, year long deployments in support of Operation Iraqi Freedom OIF. They deployed to Kuwait in late 2002 and subsequently took part in the 2003 invasion of Iraq. After that they have spent year long deployments for OIF during 2004, 2006 and 2008.

9th Comm has also participated in multiple deployments in support of Operation Enduring Freedom OEF. Their cumulative deployments saw the installation, operation, and maintenance of the largest enterprise network ever established by a Marine Corps unit aboard Camp Leatherneck. During this time, Camp Leatherneck and surrounding areas saw significant upgrades in telecommunications infrastructure as well as an increase in the availability of commercialized network services to support all base personnel. 9th Comm's presence on Camp Leatherneck lasted until the end of operations in October 2014 when the camp was turned over to Afghan control.

Unit awards
A unit citation or commendation is an award bestowed upon an organization for the action cited. Members of the unit who participated in said actions are allowed to wear on their uniforms the awarded unit citation. 9th Comm has been presented with the following awards:

See also

 List of United States Marine Corps battalions
 Organization of the United States Marine Corps

References

External links
 9th Comm's official website

Comm9